Sara El-Khouly (born February 15, 1988, in Cairo, Egypt) is an Egyptian model and beauty queen. She is of part-Croatian descent and grew up in Dubai, the United Arab Emirates.

Miss Egypt World 2010
Sara was the second runner-up in Miss Egypt 2010 national pageant and was crowned Miss Egypt World 2010 on July 7, 2010, in Cairo. At the time of the coronation, she was a student at the American University of Sharjah. Eventually, on October 20, 2010, she represented her nation at the Miss World 2010 beauty pageant, held in Sanya, China. She did not place among the 25 semi-finalists of the pageant, which was won by Alexandria Mills, representing the United States.

Miss Mediterranean 2011
On June 4, 2011, Sara represented Egypt at the 2011 Miss Mediterranean pageant held in Nicosia, Cyprus. She beat 14 other contestants to take home the crown and title. This marked the first Egyptian representative to an international pageant after the 2011 Egyptian revolution.

Miss Universe 2011
Due to the political situation in Egypt, there was no national pageant in 2011. As an experienced beauty pageant contestant, Sara was therefore handpicked as the official Egyptian representative to the 2011 Miss Universe pageant to be held on September 12, 2011, in São Paulo, Brazil.

References

External links
Sara El-Khouly on Twitter

1988 births
Living people
Egyptian female models
Miss Egypt winners
Models from Cairo
American University of Sharjah alumni
Egyptian people of Croatian descent
Egyptian expatriates in the United Arab Emirates
Miss World 2010 delegates
Miss Universe 2011 contestants